Kweku Baako Jnr is a Ghanaian journalist and the editor-in-chief of the New Crusading Guide newspaper. He is a frequent panelist on radio shows in Ghana, including Peace FM's weekday morning show and Newsfile, a current affairs programme on Joy FM (Ghana). In 1999 he was awarded the Journalist of the Year by the Ghana Journalists Association. He was polled as the 39th most influential Ghanaian in 2014 by ETV.

References

Living people
Ghanaian journalists
Year of birth missing (living people)